Sanctuary of St. Jadwiga in Trzebnica, also known as Trzebnica Abbey, Was a convent for Cistercian nuns in Trzebnica, north of Wrocław, in Silesia, Poland, founded in 1203. It was abandoned for a few decades in the 19th century, and then was taken over by the Sisters of Mercy of St. Borromeo in 1889.

History
The abbey was established by the Silesian Piast Duke Henry I the Bearded and his wife Saint Hedwig of Andechs, confirmed by Pope Innocent III. The legend of its foundation relates that once Duke Henry when out hunting fell into a swamp from which he could not extricate himself. In return for rescue from this perilous position, he vowed to build the abbey. With Hedwig's consent, her brother Ekbert of Andechs, then Bishop of Bamberg, chose the first nuns that occupied the convent. The first abbess was Petrussa from Kitzingen Abbey; she was followed by Gertrude, the daughter of Hedwig. The abbey was richly endowed with lands by Duke Henry. When Hedwig became a widow in 1238, she went to live at Trzebnica and was buried there.

Up to 1515, the abbesses were the first princesses of the Piast dynasty and afterwards members of the nobility. It is said that towards the end of the thirteenth century the nuns numbered 120. The abbey also became a mausoleum of many rulers of the fragmented Silesian Piasts. In 1672 there were 32 nuns and 6 lay sisters, in 1805 there were 23 nuns and 6 lay sisters. The abbey suffered from all kinds of misfortunes both in the Middle Ages and later: from famine in 1315, 1338, 1434, and 1617, from disastrous fires in 1413, 1432, 1464, 1486, 1505, 1595, and 1782. At the Protestant Reformation, most of the nuns were Poles, as were the majority until the eighteenth century. The abbey of Trebnitz suffered so greatly during the Thirty Years War that the nuns fled across the border on the territory of the most unaffected Polish–Lithuanian Commonwealth, as they did again in 1663 when the Turks threatened Silesia.

In 1742, in the aftermath of the First Silesian War and the Treaty of Breslau, Trebnitz found itself under the governance of Protestant Prussia and started to suffer from political discrimination. The last abbess, Dominica von Giller, died on 17 August 1810, and on 11 November 1810, the abbey was suppressed and secularized by order of King Frederick William III. The building, which was very extensive, was sold later and turned into a cloth factory. In the late 19th century, the ruined abbey was bought by Knights Hospitaller and later by the female order of Sisters of St. Charles Borromeo as a hospital conducted by the sisters.

Abbey church
The church, a basilica with pillars in the late Romanesque style, to which Baroque additions were made from 1741. It features several paintings with scenes from the life of St. Hedwig by Michael Willmann. After the secularisation of the abbey, it became the Trebnitz parish church.

The grave of St. Hedwig is located in a chapel to the right of the high altar, donated by her grandson Archbishop Ladislaus of Salzburg in 1267. The grave of Duke Henry I, her husband, is in front of the altar.

Burials
Konrad the Curly, son of Henry I and St. Hedwig, 1213
Henry I the Bearded, High Duke of Poland, Duke of Silesia and Wrocław, 1238
Hedwig of Andechs, widow, 1243
Konrad von Feuchtwangen, Grand Master of the Teutonic Knights, 1296
Karolina of Legnica-Brieg, last scion of the Silesian Piasts, 1707

References

Attribution
 The entry cites:
SCHMIDT, Gesch. des Klosterstiftes Trebnitz (Oppein, 1853); 
Bach., Gesch. und Beschreibung des Klosterstiftes in Trebnitz (Neisse, 1859); 
JUNGNITZ, Wahrfahrtsbuchlein fur Verehrer der hl. Hedwig (3d ed., Breslau, 1902).

External links 

Catholic Encyclopedia: Trebnitz Abbey

Cistercian monasteries in Poland
1203 establishments in Europe
13th-century establishments in Poland
Basilica churches in Poland
Trzebnica County
Buildings and structures in Lower Silesian Voivodeship
Trzebnica
Jadwiga
Jadwiga
Types of church buildings